The 2013 Fort Lauderdale Strikers season is the third season of the team in the North American Soccer League, and the entire club's thirty-ninth season in professional soccer.  The NASL inaugurated a new format this year in which the season would be split into two, having a spring and fall tournament.  The team finished in seventh place during the spring season, and is currently in third place during the fall season.

Squad

Current roster

Squad Breakdown
Updated May 16, 2012.

Transfers

In

Out

Contracts
New contracts and contract extensions.

Competitions

Preseason

Friendlies

NASL Spring Championship 
The New York Cosmos and the Puerto Rico Islanders will not be participating in the spring season.
 The season will begin April 6 and end July 4, 2013.

Standings

Results summary

Results by round

Match results

U.S. Open Cup

Squad statistics

NASL Spring Championship

Players

Goalkeepers

Top scorers
Includes all competitive matches. The list is sorted by shirt number when total goals are equal.

{| class="wikitable" style="font-size: 95%; text-align: center;"
|-
!width=15|
!width=15|
!width=15|
!width=15|
!width=150|Name
!width=130|NASL
!width=120|U.S. Open Cup
!width=80|Total
|-
|rowspan=3|1
|7
|FW
|
|David Foley
|2
|0
|2
|-
|15
|DF
|
|Scott Gordon
|2
|0
|2
|-
|20
|MF
|
|Mark Anderson
|1
|1
|2
|-
|rowspan=4|2
|9
|FW
|
|Jemal Johnson
|1
|0
|1
|-
|10
|MF
|
|Walter Restrepo
|1
|0
|1
|-
|14
|MF
|
|Carlos Salazar
|1
|0
|1
|-
|21
|MF
|
|Darnell King
|1
|0
|1
|-
|colspan="4"|
|TOTALS
|9
|1
|10

Top Assists
Includes all competitive matches. The list is sorted by shirt number when total assists are equal.

{| class="wikitable" style="font-size: 95%; text-align: center;"
|-
!width=15|
!width=15|
!width=15|
!width=15|
!width=150|Name
!width=130|NASL
!width=120|U.S. Open Cup
!width=80|Total
|-
|rowspan=2|1
|21
|DF
|
|Darnell King
|1
|1
|2
|-
|23
|MF
|
|Manny Gonzalez
|2
|0
|2
|-
|rowspan=3|2
|5
|DF
|
|Toni Ståhl
|1
|0
|1
|-
|8
|MF
|
|Pecka
|1
|0
|1
|-
|9
|FW
|
|Jemal Johnson
|1
|0
|1
|-
|colspan="4"|
|TOTALS
|6
|1
|7

Starting XI
This shows the most used players in each position, based on the Striker's typical starting formation for the season.

Club staff

{|class="wikitable"
|-
!Position
!Name
|-
|President|| Tom Mulroy
|-
|Managing Director|| Tim Robbie
|-
|Director of Operations|| Miguel Lopez
|-
|Head coach|| Daryl Shore
|-
|Assistant coach|| Raoul Voss
|-
|Goalkeepers Coach|| Ricardo Lopes
|-
|Head Athletic Trainer|| Joe Caroccio
|-

Recognition 
Team of the Week
Week 1: David Foley, Pecka, Toni Ståhl 
Week 4: Walter Restrepo 
Week 5: Jeff Attinella, Shavar Thomas, Manny Gonzalez, Jemal Johnson

References

External links
 Strikers Official site
 Flight 19 supporters group
 Miami FC Supporters Group 

2013
Fort Lauderdale Strikers
Fort Lauderdale Strikers
Fort Lauderdale Strikers season